The Rhinluch is a fen landscape in the German state of Brandenburg, bisected by the river Rhin to which it owes its name. This wetland region lies north of Fehrbellin in the county of Ostprignitz-Ruppin. The suffix luch is used to describe several wet areas in the state of Brandenburg, in which, prior to the advent of modern drainage systems, water remained largely stagnant rather than flowing.

The Rhinluch was formed during the last ice age and its post-glacial period. About 16,000 years ago, the Eberswald urstromtal was formed by the meltwaters of the glacial ice sheet as they drained away to the sea. Later, this broad river valley dried up as the ice sheet retreated during the late ice age. In the land that makes up the present-day Rhinluch, lakes initially formed in individual places, especially where there were dead ice kettle holes. Over the course of time, these became bogs through the natural silting up process. In addition, during the post-glacial period, there was a widespread formation of swamps (Versumpfungsmooren) on the sands of the urstromtal. Not until man appeared, however, did these moors become pastures and meadows as a result of land improvement measures. The easternmost outlier of the Rhinluch is the Kremmener Luch.

The Rhinluch is home to the extremely rare European pond turtle.

The Brandenburg poet, Theodor Fontane, described the Rhinluch thus in his Wanderungen durch die Mark Brandenburg:

External links 

 Society for the Preservation of the Upper Rhinluch (Landschaftsförderverein Oberes Rhinluch)

Regions of Brandenburg
Havelland